Vegas del Genil is a municipality in the province of Granada, Spain. As of 2009, it had a population of 7537 inhabitants.

Sister city 
  Ouagadou, Mali

External links 

 Official web site

References

Municipalities in the Province of Granada